U Khanapur  is a village in the southern state of Karnataka, India. It is located in the Hukeri taluk of Belgaum district in Karnataka.

Demographics
 India census, U Khanapur has a population of 7392 with 3684 males and 3708 females.

See also
 Sankeshwar
 Hukeri
 Belgaum
 Karnataka
 Districts of Karnataka

References

External links
 http://Belgaum.nic.in/

Villages in Belagavi district